Charles Monroe Best (July 25, 1874 – July 4, 1962) was an American football and basketball coach.  He served as the head football coach at Drake University (1900–1901), Purdue University (1902), and Sewanee: The University of the South (1917–1918), compiling a career college football record of 24–13–3.  Best was also the head basketball coach at Purdue for one season in 1901–1902, tallying a mark of 10–3.

Coaching career

Drake
Best was the fifth head football coach at Drake University in Des Moines, Iowa, serving for two seasons, from 1900 to 1901, and compiling a record of 10–7.

Purdue
Best coached the 1902 season at Purdue University in West Lafayette, Indiana.  He had his most successful season at Purdue, posting a record of 7–2–1.

Head coaching record

Football

References

1874 births
1962 deaths
19th-century players of American football
American football quarterbacks
Basketball coaches from Pennsylvania
Drake Bulldogs football coaches
Lafayette Leopards football players
Purdue Boilermakers football coaches
Purdue Boilermakers men's basketball coaches
Sewanee Tigers football coaches
People from Mechanicsburg, Pennsylvania